"Dumpin' Em in Ditches" is a hit‐track from the American rapper Spice 1's second studio album, 187 He Wrote, released on September 28, 1993 on Jive Records.  The song reached #34 on the Hot Dance Music/Maxi-Singles Sales chart and #79 on the Hot R&B/Hip-Hop Singles & Tracks chart. Along with the single, a music video was also released for the song. The music video features Spice 1 singing, portrayed as a made man or a gangster, interspersed with various clips from 1930s and 1940s gangster movies. The song was later included on the first Spice 1's greatest hits album, Hits, in 1998.

References

1993 songs
1993 singles
Spice 1 songs
Jive Records singles
Gangsta rap songs